Major Rawshan Yazdani Bhuiyan (died 1981) was a Bangladeshi freedom fighter. He was accused by Government of Bangladesh for taking part in the assassination of president Ziaur Rahman, and was hanged in 1981.

Education
Rowshan was graduated from Faujdarhat Cadet College. He wanted to be involved into farming, and so after graduation from the Faujdarhat Cadet College when most of his classmates went to military or engineering, he went to Bangladesh Agricultural University, Mymensingh.

Liberation war 
However, during the Bangladesh liberation war in 1971, he joined the liberation war and after independence, Rowshan was given a commission in the Bangladesh Army. As he had joined the army much later, he was still a Major when his college classmates were already Colonels or Brigadiers in the army.

Role in assassination of Ziaur Rahman 

Rowshan's role in the assassination is unclear. He was not one of the members of the group who had gone to the Circuit House that night.

However, Rowshan was arrested in the remote Chittagong village, while he was with General Manzoor's wife and family, trying to find a secure place for them. By that time, with General Manzoor's had already being killed. According to Rowshan's close friends, "when others had conveniently left Manzoor and joined hands with then CAS Hussain Muhammad Ershad, Rowshan took it up on his shoulder the responsibility of saving the family of the fallen General."

Death
Rowshan was found guilty by Military Tribunal.

Rowshan's closest friend in Cadet College was Brigadier General Ashraf who was then Chief of NSI and was personal secretary to the then CAS Hussain Muhammad Ershad. Rowshan's another close friend Amin (CSP) was PS to the President Ziaur Rahman and was present during the killing in the same Chittagong Circuit House.

As Rowshan's last wish, the jail authorities allowed him to send a short telegram to the person he possibly still considered his closest friend. Rowshan send a telegram to Brigadier General Ashraf which said "Save Life". Brigadier General Ashraf did confirm receiving the telegram.

Brigadier General Ashraf also confirmed that till the last moment Yazdani was fighting and tried to climb the well with his tied up legs thus prolonging his death and suffering.

References

1981 deaths
Bangladesh Army officers
Deaths by hanging
Year of birth missing
Faujdarhat Cadet College alumni